Kiria may refer to:

 Davit Kiria (born 1988), Georgian kickboxer
 Kiria (musician) (21st century), British singer-songwriter
 Kiria, a settlement in Adekar Municipality, Béjaïa Province, Algeria
 Kiria Kiria, an independent politician who ran in the 2004 Cook Islands general election
 , a fictional idol and playable character in 2015 video game Tokyo Mirage Sessions ♯FE

See also
 Kirian (disambiguation)
 Kirya (disambiguation)